Brian Stock is the name of:

Brian Stock (footballer), Welsh football player and manager
Brian Stock (historian), American historian